Daulis Prescott Consuegra (born 2 September 1986) is a Colombian professional boxer who has challenged once for the WBA featherweight title in 2012. His older brother Breidis Prescott is also a professional boxer.

Professional career
Prescott made his professional debut on 24 November 2006, stopping Armando Velasquez in the second round. On 8 December 2012, Prescott faced Nicholas Walters for the vacant WBA featherweight title. Scoring three knockdowns, Walters stopped Prescott in seven rounds.

Professional boxing record

References

1986 births
Living people
Sportspeople from Barranquilla
Featherweight boxers
Super-featherweight boxers
Colombian male boxers
21st-century Colombian people